Ali Saleh Kiba (26 November 1986), best known as Ali Kiba or sometimes King Kiba, is a Tanzanian singer and songwriter. He is from Kigoma and the owner of Kings Music label. According to BASATA Alikiba is one of the most successful Bongo Flava singers and considered the greatest of all time having often been referred to by many contemporaries as the "King of Bongo flava".[4][5][6][7] His musical style has been defined as polyhedric, with his style being characterized by several influences from other genres, mainly Afro pop, R&B and Rhumba. 
His lyrics develop predominantly over themes of romance, fast life, desire, regret, and emotional conflict.

Ali Kiba released his album Cinderella which broke record as the best-selling album in East African countries including Tanzania, Kenya and Uganda. He is best known for his hit songs Mwana, Aje, Chekecha Cheketua, Cinderella, Nakshi Mrembo, Usiniseme, Dushelele, Single Boy with Lady Jaydee, Mapenzi Yana Run Dunia and Macmuga. He also collaborated with R. Kelly and other African musicians on the One8 project. In 2017 he became the director of Rockstar4000. 

Following his return after a three years hiatus, he released the singles "Mwana" and "Chekecha". He won six awards at the 2015 Tanzania Music Awards and broke the record on Mkito.com for the most downloaded song of 2015. Ali Kiba is regarded as one of the best and successful artists in Tanzania of all time.

He set a new record in Tanzania after winning 5 awards at the 2022 Tanzania Music Awards which were held for the first time in 2 April 2022 after 6 years hiatus. Alikiba won Album of the Year for his third studio album "Only One King" that was released in 2021, Best Male Artist People's Choice, Best Music Video for his smash hit "Salute" featuring Nigerian Rudeboy, Best Melodic Songwriter of the Year and Best East African Artist during the ceremony.

Alikiba became the most awarded Tanzanian artist in the 2022 Tanzania Music Awards after winning 5 awards followed by Nandy and Marioo who won 3 awards both.

Early life beginning
Ali Kiba was born in Iringa to parents Saleh Omari and Tombwe Njere. He is the eldest son in a family of four. His siblings consist of his brother, Abdu Kiba who is also a musician, a sister, Zabibu Kiba and the youngest brother, Abuu Kiba.

His sister Zabibu Kiba is married to footballer Abdi Banda, with whom she has a daughter, born October 2019. The child was initially reported to be a boy.

Career 
Ali's debut album and hit single ‘Cinderella’ became the biggest selling record in East Africa in 2008 and his second album ‘Ali K 4 Real’ was released in 2009 with the mega-hits ‘Nakshi Mrembo’, ‘Nichuum’  and ‘Usiniseme’.

He was later endorsed by the mobile telephony brand Airtel Africa alongside the Billboard Most Influential Global R&B Artist of the past 25 years, American recording artist R. Kelly and seven of Africa's other megastar artists Fally Ipupa (DRC/France), 2Face Idibia (Nigeria), Amani (Kenya), Movaizhaleine (Gabon), 4X4 (Ghana), Navio (Uganda), JK (Zambia). Alikiba has been nominated for ‘Best International Act’ for Black Entertainment Film, Fashion, Television and Arts Awards in 2009, Best East African Artist for African Music Awards in 2009, Winner of Best Zouk / Rhumba Song at the Kili Music Awards in 2012, Nominated for Best Tanzanian Writer, Best Male Artists and Best Collaborating song with Lady Jaydee for Kili Music Awards in 2013.

On 20 May 2016, he signed a deal with Sony Music Entertainment. He later left Sony in 2021 after working with them for five years.

Awards and nominations

References

External links
 Official Facebook page

1986 births
Living people
Tanzanian musicians
Swahili-language singers
 Tanzanian Bongo Flava musicians
 People from Kigoma Region